Geophis sallaei, also known as Sallae's earth snake, is a snake of the colubrid family. It is endemic to Mexico.

References

Geophis
Snakes of North America
Endemic reptiles of Mexico
Taxa named by George Albert Boulenger
Reptiles described in 1894